A battery isolator is an electrical device that divides direct current (DC) into multiple branches and only allows current in one direction in each branch.  The primary benefit of such an arrangement is the ability to simultaneously charge more than one battery from a single power source (e.g., an alternator) without connecting the battery terminals together in parallel.

Advantages and disadvantages
This is beneficial because a weak or dead battery will drain the charge from a strong battery if both are connected directly together.  The disadvantage to an isolator is added cost and complexity, and if a diode-type isolator is used (which is very common) there is additional voltage drop in the circuit between the charging source and the batteries.

Uses
Battery isolators are commonly used on recreational vehicles, boats, utility vehicles, airplanes, and large trucks where one battery is dedicated to starting and running the engine and another battery or batteries run accessory loads (e.g., winches, radar, instruments, etc.).  A battery isolator helps to ensure that the starting battery has sufficient power to start the engine and recharge the batteries if, for example, loads on the auxiliary battery (e.g., refrigerator or navigation lights) cause it to be drained, or if an auxiliary battery fails.  Isolators are also used in vehicles with large, high-power car stereos and off road vehicles to accommodate high current loads such as a recovery winch.

Components
Several technologies have been used to achieve control of DC in this manner: silicon rectifier packages, Schottky rectifier packages, MOSFET rectifier packages, and conventional mechanical relays.

References

Switches